HMS Thermopylae (P355) was a T-class submarine in service with the United Kingdom's Royal Navy.  So far she has been the only ship of the Royal Navy to bear the name Thermopylae, after the Battle of Thermopylae.

History 
Thermopylae was laid down on 26 October 1943 at Chatham Dockyard, and launched on 27 June 1945.

Commissioned after the end of the Second World War, she had a relatively quiet career.  She immediately joined the 3rd Flotilla based in the Holy Loch.  On 15 January 1950 she ran aground on Stevenson Rock, off Skerryvore, Inner Hebrides. In 1953 she took part in the Fleet Review to celebrate the Coronation of Queen Elizabeth II.

She remained in service until December 1968 when she was put on the sale list. She was broken up at Troon during 1971.

References

Publications
 
 

 

British T-class submarines of the Royal Navy
Ships built in Barrow-in-Furness
1945 ships
World War II submarines of the United Kingdom
Cold War submarines of the United Kingdom
Maritime incidents in 1950